Minasniyuq (Spanish minas mines, Quechua -ni, -yuq  suffixes, "the one with mines", hispanicized spelling Minasnioc) is a mountain in the Andes of Peru, about  high. It is located in the Arequipa Region, Castilla Province, Andagua District. Minasniyuq lies south of Wakapallqa, southwest of Llallawi and southeast of Puma Ranra. It is situated at the Q'illu Q'illu valley (Jellojello).

References 

Mountains of Peru
Mountains of Arequipa Region